Carlos Heredia is a Mexican economist and academic born in Tampico, Tamaulipas in 1956. Heredia served as a (PRD) Member of Mexico's 57th Congress from 1997 to 2000.

He has held senior positions with Mexico’s Treasury Department and the Government of Mexico City. He was Senior Advisor on International Affairs to Lázaro Cárdenas-Batel, Governor of the State of Michoacán, from 2003 to 2008. He was the economic and international affairs spokesperson of the presidential campaign of Cuauhtémoc Cárdenas in 2000 and has since been his advisor in the Foundation for Democracy.

Carlos Heredia has worked for almost thirty years with development NGOs, including two of Mexico's leading organizations of civil society, Equipo PUEBLO and Iniciativa Ciudadana para la Promoción de la Cultura del Diálogo.

Heredia was part of the Independent Task Force on Building a North American Community, sponsored by the Council on Foreign Relations in 2005. He is a member of the International Committee of the Latin American Migrant Community Summit. Since 2008 he has served on the Advisory Board of the Mexico Institute at the Woodrow Wilson International Center for Scholars in Washington DC.

He is a founding member and current associate of the Mexican Council on Foreign Relations (Comexi) and served as its Vice president during 2003-2006. He served as the Co-Director of the Binational Task Force on the U.S.-Mexico Border, sponsored by Comexi and the Pacific Council on International Policy (PCIP) in 2009.

Heredia attended ITAM in Mexico City and graduated from McGill University in Montréal, Canada. He has taught at ITAM and the Tampico Campus of the Monterrey Tech.

Heredia has authored over 80 articles in specialized journals and half a dozen book chapters on economics, multilateral banks, foreign policy, international cooperation, international relations of subnational governments, migration, North American integration and Mexico-China bilateral relations. He writes a Sunday column for MILENIO and is a frequent commentator in Mexican news media, including W Radio.

He is currently an associate professor at the China Studies Unit of the Center for Research and Teaching in Economics (CIDE) in Mexico City.

References

1956 births
Mexican economists
People from Tampico, Tamaulipas
Living people